Shored Up is a 2013 documentary film, produced and directed by Ben Kalina. The film premiered at 2013 Montclair Film Festival on May 5, 2013.

The Film broadcast on DirecTV on October 23, 2013. It had a theatrical release in United States on November 29, 2013. It won the Hilton Worldwide LightStay Sustainability Award (including $25,000 grant) at 2014 Sundance Film Festival.

The film was banned from screening at North Carolina Museum of Natural Sciences.

Synopsis
The film explains the dangers of accelerating Sea-Level Rise through devastating effects of Hurricane Sandy.

Reception
Shored Up received mostly positive reviews from critics. Geoff Berkshire of Variety praised the film by saying that "Ben Kalina's sturdy documentary debut delivers a sobering examination of the threat of rising sea levels." Neil Genzlinger of The New York Times, gave the film a positive review that "The film not only explores the fruitlessness of trying to stabilize shorelines that nature prefers to keep in flux, but it also looks at issues like who benefits from, and who pays for, these expensive efforts." Daphne Howland in her review for The Village Voice said that "Our seemingly innate desire to hang on to disappearing sand, which is essentially what our barrier islands are, is beautifully illustrated by the film's cinematography and historical footage."

References

External links
 Official website
 
 

2013 films
American documentary films
2013 documentary films
Documentary films about environmental issues
Hurricane Sandy
Sundance Film Festival award winners
2010s English-language films
2010s American films